AFC Wimbledon Development squad and Academy  are the youth teams of professional English association football club AFC Wimbledon. Under the Elite Player Performance Plan (EPPP) system for youth development, the academy has been granted Category Three status. The Under-18 squad currently competes in Football League Youth Alliance South East Conference. The Under 18's squad play their home matches in the FA Youth Cup at Kingsmeadow, in Kingston upon Thames, London. Whilst the Under 23's play a majority of their matches at Merstham F.C. most other matches are held at the club's New Malden training complex. The development squad competes in the Under–21 Premier League Cup.

History
The AFC Wimbledon Academy was founded in 2003. In 2010, the Under-13s squad won the Tesco Cup, having triumphed through the County and Regional rounds of the competition, by beating Lytham St Annes YMCA 2–0 in the final.

Current academy and youth development staff

Current Youth Development Squads

Under-23s Development squad

Out on loan

Under-18s squad 
Under the Elite Player Performance Plan (EPPP) system for youth development, the AFC Wimbledon Academy has been granted Category Three Academy status. The club currently competes in the Merit League One of the Football Youth Alliance.

Out on loan

Notable Academy graduates 
Players in bold went on to sign professional contracts and are currently playing for the senior first team. Players in italics subsequently went on to be signed by a Premier League club.

  Dan Agyei
  Jayden Antwi
  Ossama Ashley
  Tom Beere
  Neşet Bellikli
  Tyler Burey
  Josef Bursik
  Alfie Egan
  Great Evans
  Jim Fenlon
  Dan Gallagher
  Luke Gambin
  Ben Harrison
  Anthony Hartigan
  Chris Hussey
  Femi Ilesanmi
  Ryan Jackson
  Huw Johnson
  Egli Kaja
  Paul Kalambayi
  Brendan Kiernan
  Will Mannion
  Frankie Merrifield
  Ethan Nelson-Roberts
  Will Nightingale
  George Oakley
  Toyosi Olusanya
  Toby Sibbick
  Ryan Sweeney
  Jack Turner

References 

AFC Wimbledon
Football academies in England
2003 establishments in England
Association football clubs established in 2003